The 2018 Scottish League Cup final was the 73rd final of the Scottish League Cup, which took place on 2 December 2018 at Hampden Park, Glasgow. The clubs contesting the final were Celtic and Aberdeen. Celtic won the match 1–0, winning their 18th League Cup and 7th consecutive domestic trophy.

Route to the final

As both clubs participated in European competitions, they both received a bye through the 2018–19 Scottish League Cup group stage.

Celtic

Aberdeen

Match

Summary
Ryan Christie scored the only goal of the game in the fifth minute of time added on in the first half when he took down a ball on the edge of the penalty area from Dedryck Boyata, his initial shot with his right foot was saved by Joe Lewis but he followed up by shooting with his left foot to the roof of the net.	
Celtic were awarded a penalty in the 52nd minute for a hand-ball by Dominic Ball.		
Scott Sinclair's took the penalty which was saved by Joe Lewis diving to his right. The win was Brendan Rodgers seventh straight domestic trophy win with Celtic and Celtic's 18th Scottish League Cup win.

Details

See also
Played between same teams:
2016 Scottish League Cup final (November) 
2017 Scottish Cup Final

References

2018
2
Celtic F.C. matches
Aberdeen F.C. matches
2010s in Glasgow
Sports competitions in Glasgow
December 2018 sports events in the United Kingdom
League Cup final